Hoàng Vissai or Dio Preye (born 15 January 1985), is a Nigerian footballer who gained Vietnamese citizenship in 2010. He plays as a centre-back for the V.League 1 club Quảng Nam, on loan from Hải Phòng.

Honours
Vietnamese Cup:
 Winners : 2013
Vietnamese Super Cup:
 Winners : 2014

References 

1985 births
Living people
Association football central defenders
Nigerian footballers
Nigerian expatriate footballers
Expatriate footballers in Vietnam
Lam Dong FC players
Thanh Hóa FC players
Can Tho FC players
Naturalized citizens of Vietnam
Vietnamese people of Nigerian descent
Sportspeople from Kaduna